Willi Winkler (24 August 1903 – 12 May 1967) was a German international footballer.

References

1903 births
1967 deaths
Association football forwards
German footballers
Germany international footballers
Wormatia Worms players